Furduieşti may refer to several villages in Romania:

 Furduieşti, a village in the town of Câmpeni, Alba County
 Furduieşti, a village in Sohodol Commune, Alba County